Purandar Assembly constituency is one of the 288 Vidhan Sabha (legislative assembly) constituencies of Maharashtra state, western India. This constituency is located in Pune district.

Geographical scope
The constituency comprises Purandar taluka, parts of Hadapsar revenue circle such as Pisoli village (ward no 135 of Pune Municipal Corporation (PMC)), Undri village (ward no 136 of PMC), Ambegaon Budruk village (ward no 141 of PMC), Ambegaon Khurd village (ward no. 142 of PMC) and rest of the revenue circle excluding other areas under PMC.

Members of Legislative Assembly

References

Assembly constituencies of Pune district
Assembly constituencies of Maharashtra